Maurice Horn (born 1931) is a French-American comics historian, author, and editor, considered to be one of the first serious academics to study comics. He is the editor of The World Encyclopedia of Comics, The World Encyclopedia of Cartoons, and 100 Years of American Newspaper Comics. Born in France, he is based in New York City.

Career
Horn grew up in France particularly fascinated by American comics.

In the late 1950s, collaborating with countryman  (later the editorial director of the French publisher Dargaud) under the joint pen names  Karl von Kraft and Franck Sauvage (after Doc Savage), Horn co-wrote a number of French-language pulp mystery and spy novels.

From 1956 to 1960, Horn and Moliterni (as Franck Sauvage) wrote the radio mystery show Allô... Police! for Radio Luxemburg.

Looking for more lucrative writing work, Horn emigrated to the United States in 1959. Returning frequently to France, he was a member of the 1960s groups Club Bande Dessinée and SOCERLID ("Société civile d’études et de recherché des littératures dessinées"), which championed the idea of comics as "the ninth art" and worthy of academic study. Horn was instrumental in organizing three important exhibitions of comics art in the late 1960s and early 1970s:
 Bande dessinée et figuration narrative. 7 April–12 June 1967, Musée des Arts Décoratifs, Paris
 AAARGH!: a Celebration of Comics. 31 December 1970 – 7 February 1971, Institute of Contemporary Arts, London
 75 Years of the Comics. 8 September–7 November 1971, New York Cultural Center, New York

Horn's two-volume The World Encyclopedia of Comics, first published in 1976, focused on American and European comics (although not exclusively), with extensive biographical notes and publication histories. It was one of the first and most comprehensive resources of its kind, and spawned seven volumes. A complete edition was published in 1997 (and updated again in 1999), and included the work of fifteen contributors.

His Comics of the American West (1977) traced the history of Western comics, dissecting how they contributed to the mythology of the American West.

The World Encyclopedia of Cartoons (first published in 1979) profiles the lives and work of more than 1,5000 cartoonists and animators from the United States, Europe, Russia, Japan, and South America. Horn was lead editor, Rick Marschall was assistant editor, and there were more than twenty other contributors. A second volume was published in 1980; the fifth volume was published in 1983.

Horn's publications in the 1980s included his book Sex in the Comics (1985), which dealt with such topics as sex and violence, and the sex lives of superheroes. His dictionary-style reference book Contemporary Graphic Artists (1986) included designers as well as illustrators, animators, and cartoonists, and highlighted each entrant's most famous works.

Horn's 1996 tome 100 Years of American Newspaper Comics is considered the definitive history of American comic strips. At more than 400 pages, it is an encyclopedia-style rundown of every significant American comic strip from the late 1890s to the current day.

Horne was given the Special John Buscema Haxtur Award at the 2007 Salón Internacional del Cómic del Principado de Asturias (International Comics Convention of the Principality of Asturias).

In popular culture 
Milton Caniff styled the Steve Canyon character M’sieu Toute (appearing in July through September 1968) after Horn.

Books

Nonfiction 
 (with Pierre C. Couperie) A History of the Comic Strip (Crown Publishers, 1968) — translated from the French by Eileen Hennessy
 (editor) The Golden Age of the Comics No. 7, Mandrake in Hollywood (Nostalgia Press, 1970)
 75 Years of the Comics (Boston Book of Art, 1971)  — catalogue of the exhibition curated by Horn
 (editor) The World Encyclopedia of Comics (Chelsea House, 1976) 
 (Italian edition) Enciclopedia Mondiale del Fumetto (Editoriale Corno, 1978) – translated by Luciano Secchi
 Comics of the American West (New Win Publishing, 1977) 
 Women in the Comics (3 volumes, Chelsea House, Philadelphia, Pa., USA, 1st edition 1977, 2011)  .
 (editor) Burne Hogarth's The Golden Age of Tarzan: 1939-1942 (Chelsea House, 1977)
 (editor) The World Encyclopedia of Cartoons (Chelsea House, 1979)  — 6 volumes
 Sex in the Comics (Chelsea House, 1985) 
 Contemporary Graphic Artists: A Biographical, Bibliographical, and Critical Guide to Current Illustrators, Animators, Cartoonists, Designers, and Other Graphic Artists (Gale Research / Cengage Learning, 1986) 
 (editor) 100 Years of American Newspaper Comics: An Illustrated Encyclopedia (Gramercy Books, 1996)

Fiction 
With Claude Moliterni as Karl von Kraft:
 Espions en Blouses Blanches ("Spies in White Coats") (Arabesque, 1956)
 Rafales su l’Asia ("Gusts on Asia") (Arabesque, 1957)
 Jusqu’au dernier sursaut ("Until the Last Gasp") (Arabesque, 1957)

With Claude Moliterni as Franck Sauvage:
 Corps à Corps en Corée ("Close Combat in Korea") (1958)
 La mort au grand gallop ("Death at a Gallop") (1957)
 Le Jeu du Scorpion ("The Scorpion Game") (1957)
 Envoyés du Silence ("Silent Emissaries") (1957)
 Cap sur le cap ("Cape on Cape Town") (1958)
 A Vous Couper le Souffle ("Breathtaking") (Librairie de la Cité, 1958)

Writings 
 "Comics and Cinema: The Beginnings (1896–1913)". International Journal of Comic Art. 9 (2): 60 (15 October 2007).

See also
Allan Holtz
Bill Blackbeard
Woody Gelman
 Ron Goulart
 Don Markstein
 Rick Marschall
 Trina Robbins
Dave Strickler

References

1931 births
American art historians
Comics critics
Living people
French writers
21st-century American non-fiction writers
20th-century American non-fiction writers